Nova Scotia is one of the thirteen provinces and territories of Canada. It is one of the three Maritime provinces and one of the four Atlantic provinces. Nova Scotia is Latin for "New Scotland".

Most of the population are native English-speakers, and the province's population is 969,383 according to the 2021 Census. It is the most populous of Canada's Atlantic provinces. It is the country's second-most densely populated province and second-smallest province by area, both after Prince Edward Island. Its area of  includes Cape Breton Island and 3,800 other coastal islands. The Nova Scotia peninsula is connected to the rest of North America by the Isthmus of Chignecto, on which the province's land border with New Brunswick is located. The province borders the Bay of Fundy and Gulf of Maine to the west and the Atlantic Ocean to the south and east, and is separated from Prince Edward Island and the island of Newfoundland by the Northumberland and Cabot straits, respectively.

The land that comprises what is now Nova Scotia was inhabited by the Miꞌkmaq people at the time of European exploration. In 1605, Acadia—France's first New France colony—was founded with the creation of Acadia's capital, . Britain fought France for the territory on numerous occasions for over a century afterwards. The Fortress of Louisbourg was a key focus point in the battle for control. Subsequent to the Great Upheaval (1755–1763) where the British deported the Acadians en masse, the Conquest of New France (1758–1760) by the British, and the Treaty of Paris (1763), France had to surrender Acadia to the British Empire. During the American Revolutionary War (1775–1783), thousands of Loyalists settled in Nova Scotia. In 1848, Nova Scotia became the first British colony to achieve responsible government, and it federated in July 1867 with New Brunswick and the Province of Canada (now Ontario and Quebec) to form what is now the country of Canada.

Nova Scotia's capital and largest municipality is Halifax, which is home to over 45% of the province's population as of the 2021 census. Halifax is the thirteenth-largest census metropolitan area in Canada, the largest municipality in Atlantic Canada, and Canada's second-largest coastal municipality after Vancouver.

Etymology

"Nova Scotia" means "New Scotland" in Latin and is the recognized English-language name for the province. In both French and Scottish Gaelic, the province is directly translated as "New Scotland" (French: . Gaelic). In general, Romance and Slavic languages use a direct translation of "New Scotland", while most other languages use direct transliterations of the Latin / English name.

The province was first named in the 1621 Royal Charter granting to Sir William Alexander in 1632 the right to settle lands including modern Nova Scotia, Cape Breton Island, Prince Edward Island, New Brunswick and the Gaspé Peninsula.

Geography

Nova Scotia is Canada's second-smallest province in area, after Prince Edward Island. It is surrounded by four major bodies of water: the Gulf of Saint Lawrence to the north, the Bay of Fundy to the west, the Gulf of Maine to the southwest, and the Atlantic Ocean to the east. The province's mainland is the Nova Scotia peninsula and includes numerous bays and estuaries.

Nova Scotia has many ancient fossil-bearing rock formations. These formations are particularly rich on the Bay of Fundy's shores. Blue Beach near Hantsport, Joggins Fossil Cliffs, on the Bay of Fundy's shores, has yielded an abundance of Carboniferous-age fossils. Wasson's Bluff, near the town of Parrsboro, has yielded both Triassic- and Jurassic-age fossils. The highest point is White Hill at 533 m (1,749 ft) above sea level, situated amongst the Cape Breton Highlands in the far north of the province.

Nova Scotia is located along the 45th parallel north, so it is midway between the Equator and the North Pole. The province contains 5,400 lakes.

Climate

Nova Scotia lies in the mid-temperate zone and, although the province is almost surrounded by water, the climate is closer to continental climate rather than maritime. The winter and summer temperature extremes of the continental climate are moderated by the ocean. However, winters are cold enough to be classified as continental—still being nearer the freezing point than inland areas to the west. The Nova Scotian climate is in many ways similar to the central Baltic Sea coast in Northern Europe, only wetter and snowier. This is true although Nova Scotia is some fifteen parallels further south. Areas not on the Atlantic coast experience warmer summers more typical of inland areas, and winter lows are a little colder. On 12 August 2020, the community of Grand Étang, famous for its Les Suêtes winds, recorded a balmy overnight low of

History

The province includes regions of the Mi'kmaq nation of Mi'kma'ki, the territory of which extends across the Maritimes, parts of Maine, Newfoundland and the Gaspé Peninsula. The Mi'kmaq people are part of the large Algonquian-language family and inhabited Nova Scotia at the time the first European colonists arrived.

European settlement
The first Europeans to settle the area were the French, who arrived in 1604, and Catholic Mi'kmaq and Acadians formed the majority of the population of the colony for the next 150 years. In 1605, French colonists established the first permanent European settlement in the future Canada (and the first north of Florida) at Port Royal, founding what would become known as Acadia.

Warfare was a notable feature in Nova Scotia during the 17th and 18th centuries.  During the first 80 years the French and Acadians lived in Nova Scotia, nine significant military clashes took place as the English and Scottish, Dutch and French fought for possession of the area. These encounters happened at Port Royal, Saint John, Cap de Sable (present-day Port La Tour, Nova Scotia), Jemseg (1674 and 1758) and Baleine (1629). The Acadian Civil War took place from 1640 to 1645. Beginning with King William's War in 1688, a series of six wars took place between the English, Scottish and the French, with Nova Scotia being a consistent theatre of conflict between the two powers.

18th century

Hostilities between the British and French resumed from 1702 to 1713, known as Queen Anne's War. The British siege of Port Royal took place in 1710, ending French rule in peninsular Acadia. The subsequent signing of the Treaty of Utrecht in 1713 formally recognized this, while returning Cape Breton Island and Prince Edward Island to the French. Despite the British conquest of Acadia in 1710, Nova Scotia remained primarily occupied by Catholic Acadians and Mi'kmaq, who confined British forces to Annapolis and to Canso. Present-day New Brunswick formed a part of the French colony of Acadia. Immediately after the capture of Port Royal in 1710, Francis Nicholson announced it would be renamed Annapolis Royal in honour of Queen Anne.

As a result of Father Rale's War (1722–1725), the Mi'kmaq signed a series of treaties with Great Britain in 1725. The Mi'kmaq signed a treaty of "submission" to the British crown. However, conflict between the Acadians, Mi'kmaq, French, and the British persisted in the following decades with King George's War (1744–1748).

Father Le Loutre's War (1749–1755) began when Edward Cornwallis arrived to establish Halifax with 13 transports on 21 June 1749.  A General Court, made up of the governor and the council, was the highest court in the colony at the time. Jonathan Belcher was sworn in as chief justice of the Nova Scotia Supreme Court on 21 October 1754. The first legislative assembly in Halifax, under the Governorship of Charles Lawrence, met on 2 October 1758. During the French and Indian War of 1754–1763 (the North American theatre of the Seven Years' War), the British deported the Acadians and recruited New England Planters to resettle the colony. The 75-year period of war ended with the Halifax Treaties between the British and the Mi'kmaq (1761). After the war, some Acadians were allowed to return.

In 1763, most of Acadia (Cape Breton Island, St. John's Island (now Prince Edward Island), and New Brunswick) became part of Nova Scotia. In 1765, the county of Sunbury was created. This included the territory of present-day New Brunswick and eastern Maine as far as the Penobscot River. In 1769, St. John's Island became a separate colony.

The American Revolution (1775–1783) had a significant impact on shaping Nova Scotia. Initially, Nova Scotia—"the 14th American Colony" as some called it—displayed ambivalence over whether the colony should join the more southern colonies in their defiance of Britain, and rebellion flared at the Battle of Fort Cumberland (1776) and at the Siege of Saint John (1777). Throughout the war, American privateers devastated the maritime economy by capturing ships and looting almost every community outside of Halifax. These American raids alienated many sympathetic or neutral Nova Scotians into supporting the British. By the end of the war, Nova Scotia had outfitted numerous privateers to attack American shipping. British military forces based at Halifax succeeded in preventing American support for rebels in Nova Scotia and deterred any invasion of Nova Scotia. However the Royal Navy failed to establish naval supremacy. While the British captured many American privateers in battles such as the Naval battle off Halifax (1782), many more continued attacks on shipping and settlements until the final months of the war. The Royal Navy struggled to maintain British supply lines, defending convoys from American and French attacks as in the fiercely fought convoy battle, the Naval battle off Cape Breton (1781).

After the Thirteen Colonies and their French allies forced the British forces to surrender in 1781, approximately 33,000 Loyalists (the King's Loyal Americans, allowed to place "United Empire Loyalist" after their names) settled in Nova Scotia (14,000 of them in what became New Brunswick) on lands granted by the Crown as some compensation for their losses. (The British administration divided Nova Scotia and hived off Cape Breton and New Brunswick in 1784). The Loyalist exodus created new communities across Nova Scotia, including Shelburne, which briefly became one of the larger British settlements in North America, and infused Nova Scotia with additional capital and skills.

The migration caused political tensions between Loyalist leaders and the leaders of the existing New England Planters settlement. The Loyalist influx also pushed Nova Scotia's 2000 Mi'kmaq People to the margins as Loyalist land grants encroached on ill-defined native lands. As part of the Loyalist migration, about 3,000 Black Loyalists arrived; they founded the largest free Black settlement in North America at Birchtown, near Shelburne. There are several Black Loyalists buried in unmarked graves in the Old Burying Ground in Halifax. Many Nova Scotian communities were settled by British regiments that fought in the war.

19th century

During the War of 1812, Nova Scotia's contribution to the British war effort involved communities either purchasing or building various privateer ships to attack U.S. vessels.  Perhaps the most dramatic moment in the war for Nova Scotia occurred when HMS Shannon escorted the captured American frigate USS Chesapeake into Halifax Harbour in 1813. Many of the U.S. prisoners were kept at Deadman's Island.

Nova Scotia became the first colony in British North America and in the British Empire to achieve responsible government in January–February 1848 and become self-governing through the efforts of Joseph Howe. Nova Scotia had established representative government in 1758, an achievement later commemorated by the erection of the Dingle Tower in 1908.

Nova Scotians fought in the Crimean War of 1853–1856. The 1860 Welsford-Parker Monument in Halifax is the second-oldest war monument in Canada and the only Crimean War monument in North America. It commemorates the 1854–55 Siege of Sevastopol. 

Thousands of Nova Scotians fought in the American Civil War (1861–1865), primarily on behalf of the North. The British Empire (including Nova Scotia) declared itself neutral in the conflict. As a result, Britain (and Nova Scotia) continued to trade with both the South and the North. Nova Scotia's economy boomed during the Civil War.

Post-Confederation history
Soon after the American Civil War, Pro-Canadian Confederation premier Charles Tupper led Nova Scotia into Canadian Confederation on 1 July 1867, along with New Brunswick and the Province of Canada. The Anti-Confederation Party was led by Joseph Howe. Almost three months later, in the election of 18 September 1867, the Anti-Confederation Party won 18 out of 19 federal seats, and 36 out of 38 seats in the provincial legislature.

Throughout the 19th century, numerous businesses developed in Nova Scotia became of pan-Canadian and international importance: the Starr Manufacturing Company (first ice skate manufacturer in Canada), the Bank of Nova Scotia, Cunard Line, Alexander Keith's Brewery, Morse's Tea Company (first tea company in Canada), among others. 

Nova Scotia became a world leader in both building and owning wooden sailing ships in the second half of the 19th century. Nova Scotia produced internationally recognized shipbuilders Donald McKay and William Dawson Lawrence. The fame Nova Scotia achieved from sailors was assured in 1895 when Joshua Slocum became the first man to sail single-handedly around the world. International attention continued into the following century with the many racing victories of the Bluenose schooner. Nova Scotia was also the birthplace and home of Samuel Cunard, a British shipping magnate (born at Halifax, Nova Scotia) who founded the Cunard Line.

In December 1917, about 2,000 people were killed in the Halifax Explosion. 

In April 2004 when its Nova Scotia legislature adopted a resolution explicitly inviting the government of the Turks and Caicos Islands to explore the possibility of joining Canada as part of that Province.citation needed

In April 2020, a killing spree occurred across the province and became the deadliest rampage in Canada's history.

Demographics

Population

Ethnicity 

According to the 2016 Canadian census the largest ethnic group in Nova Scotia is Scottish (30.0%), followed by English (28.9%), Irish (21.6%), French (16.5%), German (10.7%), First Nations (5.4%), Dutch (3.5%), Métis (2.9%), and Acadian (2.6%). 42.6% of respondents identified their ethnicity as "Canadian".

Language 

As of the 2021 Canadian Census, the ten most spoken languages in the province included English (951,945 or 99.59%), French (99,300 or 10.39%), Arabic (11,745 or 1.23%), Hindi (10,115 or 1.06%), Spanish (8,675 or 0.91%), Mandarin (8,525	or 0.89%), Punjabi (6,730 or 0.7%), German (6,665 or 0.7%), Miꞌkmaq (5,650 or 0.59%), and Tagalog (5,595 or 0.59%). The question on knowledge of languages allows for multiple responses.

The 2021 Canadian census showed a population of 969,383 . Of the 958,990 singular responses to the census question concerning mother tongue, the most commonly reported languages were:

Figures shown are for the number of single-language responses and the percentage of total single-language responses.

Nova Scotia is home to the largest Scottish Gaelic-speaking community outside of Scotland, with a small number of native speakers in Pictou County, Antigonish County, and Cape Breton Island, and the language is taught in a number of secondary schools throughout the province. In 2018 the government launched a new Gaelic vehicle licence plate to raise awareness of the language and help fund Gaelic language and culture initiatives. They estimated that there were 2,000 Gaelic speakers in the province.

Religion 
 
According to the 2021 census, religious groups in Nova Scotia included:
Christianity (556,115 persons or 58.2%)
Irreligion (359,395 persons or 37.6%)
Islam (14,715 persons or 1.5%)
Hinduism (8,460 persons or 0.9%)
Sikhism (4,735 persons or 0.5%)
Buddhism (2,955 persons or 0.3%)
Judaism (2,195 persons or 0.2%)
Indigenous Spirituality (1,090 persons or 0.1%)
Other (6,195 persons or 0.6%)

According to the 2011 census, the largest denominations by number of adherents were Christians with 78.2%. About 21.18% were non-religious and 1% were Muslims. Jews, Hindus, and Sikhs constitute around 0.20%.

In 1871, the largest religious denominations were Presbyterian with 103,500 (27%); Roman Catholic with 102,000 (26%); Baptist with 73,295 (19%); Anglican with 55,124 (14%); Methodist with 40,748 (10%), Lutheran with 4,958 (1.3%); and Congregationalist with 2,538 (0.65%).

Economy
GDP growth has lagged behind the rest of the country for at least the past decade. As of 2017, the median family income in Nova Scotia was $85,970, below the national average of $92,990; in Halifax the figure rises to $98,870.

The province is the world's largest exporter of Christmas trees, lobster, gypsum, and wild berries. Its export value of fish exceeds $1 billion, and fish products are received by 90 countries around the world. Nevertheless, the province's imports far exceed its exports. While these numbers were roughly equal from 1992 until 2004, since that time the trade deficit has ballooned. In 2012, exports from Nova Scotia were 12.1% of provincial GDP, while imports were 22.6%.

Nova Scotia's traditionally resource-based economy has diversified in recent decades. The rise of Nova Scotia as a viable jurisdiction in North America, historically, was driven by the ready availability of natural resources, especially the fish stocks off the Scotian Shelf. The fishery was a pillar of the economy since its development as part of New France in the 17th century; however, the fishery suffered a sharp decline due to overfishing in the late 20th century. The collapse of the cod stocks and the closure of this sector resulted in a loss of approximately 20,000 jobs in 1992.

Other sectors in the province were also hit hard, particularly during the last two decades: coal mining in Cape Breton and northern mainland Nova Scotia has virtually ceased, and a large steel mill in Sydney closed during the 1990s. More recently, the high value of the Canadian dollar relative to the US dollar has hurt the forestry industry, leading to the shutdown of a long-running pulp and paper mill near Liverpool. Mining, especially of gypsum and salt and to a lesser extent silica, peat and barite, is also a significant sector. Since 1991, offshore oil and gas has become an important part of the economy, although production and revenue are nowdeclining. However, agriculture remains an important sector in the province, particularly in the Annapolis Valley.

Nova Scotia's defence and aerospace sector generates approximately $500 million in revenues and contributes about $1.5 billion to the provincial economy each year. To date, 40% of Canada's military assets reside in Nova Scotia. Nova Scotia has the fourth-largest film industry in Canada hosting over 100 productions yearly, more than half of which are the products of international film and television producers. In 2015, the government of Nova Scotia eliminated tax credits to film production in the province, jeopardizing the industry given most other jurisdictions continue to offer such credits. The province also boasts a rapidly developing Information & Communication Technology (ICT) sector which consists of over 500 companies, and employs roughly 15,000 people.

In 2006, the manufacturing sector brought in over $2.6 billion in chained GDP, the largest output of any industrial sector in Nova Scotia. Michelin remains by far the largest single employer in this sector, operating three production plants in the province. Michelin is also the province's largest private-sector employer.

Tourism

The Nova Scotia tourism industry includes more than 6,500 direct businesses, supporting nearly 40,000 jobs. Cruise ships pay regular visits to the province. In 2010, the Port of Halifax received 261,000 passengers and Sydney 69,000. This industry contributes approximately $1.3 billion annually to the economy. A 2008 Nova Scotia tourism campaign included advertising a fictional mobile phone called Pomegranate and establishing website, which after reading about "new phone" redirected to tourism info about region.

Nova Scotia's tourism industry showcases Nova Scotia's culture, scenery and coastline. Nova Scotia has many museums reflecting its ethnic heritage, including the Glooscap Heritage Centre, Grand-Pré National Historic Site, Hector Heritage Quay and the Black Cultural Centre for Nova Scotia. Other museums tell the story of its working history, such as the Cape Breton Miners Museum, and the Maritime Museum of the Atlantic.

Nova Scotia is home to several internationally renowned musicians and there are visitor centres in the home towns of Hank Snow, Rita MacNeil, and Anne Murray Centre. There are also numerous music and cultural festivals such as the Stan Rogers Folk Festival, Celtic Colours, the Nova Scotia Gaelic Mod, Royal Nova Scotia International Tattoo, the Atlantic Film Festival and the Atlantic Fringe Festival.

The province has 87 National Historic Sites of Canada, including the Habitation at Port-Royal, the Fortress of Louisbourg and Citadel Hill (Fort George) in Halifax. Nova Scotia has two national parks, Kejimkujik and Cape Breton Highlands, and many other protected areas. The Bay of Fundy has the highest tidal range in the world, and the iconic Peggys Cove is internationally recognized and receives 600,000-plus visitors a year. Old Town Lunenburg is a port town on the South Shore that was declared a UNESCO World Heritage Site.

Acadian Skies and Mi'kmaq Lands is a starlight reserve in southwestern Nova Scotia. It is the first certified UNESCO-Starlight Tourist Destination. Starlight tourist destinations are locations that offer conditions for observations of stars which are protected from light pollution.

Government and politics

Nova Scotia is ordered by a parliamentary government within the construct of constitutional monarchy; the monarchy in Nova Scotia is the foundation of the executive, legislative, and judicial branches. The sovereign is King Charles III, who also serves as head of state of 14 other Commonwealth countries, each of Canada's nine other provinces, and the Canadian federal realm, and resides predominantly in the United Kingdom. As such, the King's representative, the Lieutenant Governor of Nova Scotia (at present Arthur Joseph LeBlanc), carries out most of the royal duties in Nova Scotia.

The direct participation of the royal and viceroyal figures in any of these areas of governance is limited, though; in practice, their use of the executive powers is directed by the Executive Council, a committee of ministers of the Crown responsible to the unicameral, elected House of Assembly and chosen and headed by the Premier of Nova Scotia (presently Tim Houston), the head of government. To ensure the stability of government, the lieutenant governor will usually appoint as premier the person who is the current leader of the political party that can obtain the confidence of a plurality in the House of Assembly. The leader of the party with the second-most seats usually becomes the Leader of His Majesty's Loyal Opposition (presently Zach Churchill) and is part of an adversarial parliamentary system intended to keep the government in check.

Each of the 51 Members of the Legislative Assembly in the House of Assembly is elected by single member plurality in an electoral district or riding. General elections must be called by the lieutenant governor on the advice of the premier, or may be triggered by the government losing a confidence vote in the House. There are three dominant political parties in Nova Scotia: the Liberal Party, the New Democratic Party, and the Progressive Conservative Party. The other two registered parties are the Green Party of Nova Scotia and the Atlantica Party, neither of which has a seat in the House of Assembly.

The province's revenue comes mainly from the taxation of personal and corporate income, although taxes on tobacco and alcohol, its stake in the Atlantic Lottery Corporation, and oil and gas royalties are also significant. In 2006–07, the province passed a budget of $6.9 billion, with a projected $72 million surplus. Federal equalization payments account for $1.385 billion, or 20.07% of the provincial revenue. The province participates in the HST, a blended sales tax collected by the federal government using the GST tax system.

On 21 July 2022, Nova Scotia became the second province in Canada to regulate online gambling by launching its own online casino through the ALC. The site will bring benefits to the economy and provide residents with a safe and secure place to gamble online.

Administrative divisions

Municipal-level governance is provided by 50 municipalities, of which there are three types: regional municipalities, towns, and county or district municipalities. Villages can exist within county or district municipalities, with a limited authority and an elected council.

Nova Scotia is divided into 18 counties. 9 of the original 18 counties retain a county-level government while the rest are either governed by regional or district municipalities. Regional municipalities are coextensive with the borders with a historic county, while historic counties governed by district municipalities are split into two district municipalities each. Despite this, Statistics Canada uses all counties of Nova Scotia for the purposes of administering the census and presenting its data, and they remain used in common parlance as geographic identifiers by Nova Scotians.

There are three regional municipalities. They may incorporate under the Municipal Government Act (MGA) of 1998, which came into force on 1 April 1999, while towns, county municipalities and district municipalities are continued as municipalities under the MGA. The MGA gives municipal councils the power to make bylaws for "health, well being, safety and protection of persons" and "safety and protection of property" in addition to a few expressed powers. Pictou was the first municipality to incorporate , and the newest municipalities are Halifax and Region of Queens Municipality both amalgamating into their present regional municipality form of government .

There are 26 towns, nine county municipalities and 12 district municipalities.

Culture

Cuisine
The cuisine of Nova Scotia is typically Canadian with an emphasis on local seafood. One endemic dish (in the sense of "peculiar to" and "originating from") is the Halifax donair, a distant variant of the doner kebab prepared using thinly sliced beef meatloaf and a sweet condensed milk sauce. As well, hodge podge, a creamy soup of fresh baby vegetables, is native to Nova Scotia.

The province is also known for a dessert called blueberry grunt.

Events and festivals

There are a number of festivals and cultural events that are recurring in Nova Scotia, or notable in its history. The following is an incomplete list of festivals and other cultural gatherings in the province:

 Annapolis Valley Apple Blossom Festival
 Atlantic Band Festival
 Atlantic Film Festival
 Atlantic Theatre Festival
 Cape Breton International Drum Festival
 Celtic Colours
 Cecilia Concerts Chamber Music Series
 Evolve Festival
 Festival Antigonish Summer Theatre
 Hal-Con
 Halifax Busker Festival
 Halifax Comedy Festival
 Halifax Jazz Festival
 Halifax Pop Explosion
 Halifax Pride
 New Glasgow Riverfront Jubilee
 Nova Scotia Gaelic Mod
 Pictou Lobster Carnival
 Royal Nova Scotia International Tattoo
 Stan Rogers Folk Festival
 Stoked for the Holidays
 Strategic Partners
 The Word on the Street
 Virgin Festival
 Wharf Rat Rally

Film and television
Nova Scotia has produced numerous film actors. Academy Award nominee Elliot Page (Juno, Inception) was born in Halifax, Nova Scotia; five-time Academy Award nominee Arthur Kennedy (Lawrence of Arabia, High Sierra) called Nova Scotia his home; and two time Golden Globe winner Donald Sutherland (MASH, Ordinary People) spent most of his youth in the province. Other actors include John Paul Tremblay, Robb Wells, Mike Smith and John Dunsworth of Trailer Park Boys and actress Joanne Kelly of Warehouse 13.

Nova Scotia has also produced numerous film directors such as Thom Fitzgerald (The Hanging Garden), Daniel Petrie (Resurrection—Academy Award nominee) and Acadian film director Phil Comeau's multiple award-winning local story (Le Secret de Jérôme).

Nova Scotian stories are the subject of numerous feature films: Margaret's Museum (starring Helena Bonham Carter); The Bay Boy (directed by Daniel Petrie and starring Kiefer Sutherland); New Waterford Girl; The Story of Adele H. (the story of unrequited love of Adèle Hugo); and two films of Evangeline (one starring Miriam Cooper and another starring Dolores del Río).

There is a significant film industry in Nova Scotia. Feature filmmaking began in Canada with Evangeline (1913), made by Canadian Bioscope Company in Halifax, which released six films before it closed. The film has since been lost. Some of the award-winning feature films made in the province are Titanic (starring Leonardo DiCaprio and Kate Winslet); The Shipping News (starring Kevin Spacey and Julianne Moore); K-19: The Widowmaker (starring Harrison Ford and Liam Neeson); Amelia (starring Hilary Swank, Richard Gere and Ewan McGregor) and The Lighthouse (starring Robert Pattinson and Willem Dafoe).

Nova Scotia has also produced numerous television series: This Hour Has 22 Minutes, Don Messer's Jubilee, Black Harbour, Haven, Trailer Park Boys, Mr. D, Call Me Fitz, and Theodore Tugboat. The Jesse Stone film series on CBS starring Tom Selleck is also routinely produced in the province.

Fine arts

Halifax hosts institutions such as Nova Scotia College of Art and Design University, Art Gallery of Nova Scotia, Neptune Theatre, and the Dalhousie Arts Centre.The province is home to avant-garde visual art and traditional crafting, writing and publishing and a film industry.

Much of the historic public art sculptures in the province were made by New York sculptor J. Massey Rhind as well as Canadian sculptors Hamilton MacCarthy, George Hill, Emanuel Hahn and Louis-Philippe Hébert. Some of this public art was also created by Nova Scotian John Wilson. Nova Scotian George Lang was a stone sculptor who also built many landmark buildings in the province, including the Welsford-Parker Monument. Two valuable sculptures/ monuments in the province are in St. Paul's Church (Halifax): one by John Gibson (for Richard John Uniacke, Jr.) and another monument by Sir Francis Leggatt Chantrey (for Amelia Ann Smyth). Both Gibson and Chantry were famous British sculptors during the Victorian era and have numerou sculptures in the Tate, Museum of Fine Arts, Boston and Westminster Abbey.

Some of the province's greatest painters were Maud Lewis, William Valentine, Maria Morris, Jack L. Gray, Ernest Lawson, Frances Bannerman, Alex Colville, and ship portrait artist John O'Brien. Some of most notable artists whose works have been acquired by Nova Scotia are British artist Joshua Reynolds (collection of Art Gallery of Nova Scotia); William Gush and William J. Weaver (both have works in Province House); Robert Field (Government House), as well as leading American artists Benjamin West (self portrait in The Halifax Club, portrait of chief justice in Nova Scotia Supreme Court), John Singleton Copley, Robert Feke, and Robert Field (the latter three have works in the Uniacke Estate). Two famous Nova Scotian photographers are Wallace R. MacAskill and Sherman Hines. Three of the most accomplished illustrators were George Wylie Hutchinson, Bob Chambers (cartoonist) and Donald A. Mackay.

Literature
There are numerous Nova Scotian authors who have achieved international fame: Thomas Chandler Haliburton (The Clockmaker), Alistair MacLeod (No Great Mischief), Evelyn Richardson (We Keep A Light), Margaret Marshall Saunders (Beautiful Joe), Laurence B. Dakin (Marco Polo), and Joshua Slocum (Sailing Alone Around the World). Other authors include Johanna Skibsrud (The Sentimentalists), Alden Nowlan (Bread, Wine and Salt), George Elliott Clarke (Execution Poems), Lesley Choyce (Nova Scotia: Shaped by the Sea), Thomas Raddall (Halifax: Warden of the North), Donna Morrissey (Kit's Law), and Frank Parker Day (Rockbound).

Nova Scotia has also been the subject of numerous literary books. Some of the international best-sellers are: Last Man Out: The Story of the Springhill Mining Disaster (by Melissa Fay Greene); Curse of the Narrows: The Halifax Explosion 1917 (by Laura MacDonald); "In the Village" (short story by Pulitzer Prize–winning author Elizabeth Bishop); and National Book Critics Circle Award winner Rough Crossings (by Simon Schama). Other authors who have written novels about Nova Scotian stories include: Linden MacIntyre (The Bishop's Man); Hugh MacLennan (Barometer Rising); Ernest Buckler (The Valley and the Mountain); Archibald MacMechan (Red Snow on Grand Pré), Henry Wadsworth Longfellow (long poem Evangeline); Lawrence Hill (The Book of Negroes) and John Mack Faragher (Great and Nobel Scheme).

Media

News
The first newspaper to be printed in Nova Scotia was the Halifax Gazette on 23 March 1752. It was also the first newspaper printed anywhere in Canada. A single copy of the first issue of the Gazette exists today, which was acquired by Library and Archives Canada on 20 June 2002 from the Massachusetts Historical Society in Boston. Newsprint made from wood pulp was invented in 1844 by Nova Scotian Charles Fenerty and was presented to the Acadian Recorder as an alternative printing medium to the paper made from other plant fibers at the time, such as cotton, which was typically made from discarded articles of clothing. Founded in 1874, the province's current primary daily broadsheet newspaper is The Chronicle Herald, which is circulated to 91,152 weekday customers, with the number increasing to 93,178 on Saturdays (2015). It is the most widely circulated newspaper in Atlantic Canada. The paper does not publish on Sundays. It is owned by the SaltWire Network, the largest media company in Atlantic Canada. The Nova Scotia Government also provides a digital archive of past newspapers via the Nova Scotia Archives website.

Radio
The province's first radio station was CHNS-FM which first aired on 12 May 1926 from the Carleton Hotel in Halifax by World War I Signal Corps soldier William C. Borrett. Today the station is owned by Maritime Broadcasting System and goes by the on-air brand name 89.9 The Wave and attracts a weekly average of 64,236 listeners between the ages of 25 and 54. It has a classic hits format, airing popular music from the 60s, 70s and 80s.

Music

Nova Scotia is home to Symphony Nova Scotia, a symphony orchestra based in Halifax. The province has produced more than its fair share of famous musicians, including Grammy Award winners Denny Doherty (from The Mamas & the Papas), Anne Murray, and Sarah McLachlan, country singers Hank Snow, George Canyon, and Drake Jensen, jazz vocalist Holly Cole, classical performers Portia White and Barbara Hannigan, multi Juno Award nominated rapper Classified, and such diverse artists as Rita MacNeil, Matt Mays, Sloan, Feist, Todd Fancey, The Rankin Family, Natalie MacMaster, Susan Crowe, Buck 65, Joel Plaskett, and the bands April Wine and Grand Dérangement

There are numerous songs written about Nova Scotia: The Ballad of Springhill (written by Peggy Seeger and performed by Irish folk singer Luke Kelly, a member of The Dubliners); several songs by Stan Rogers including Bluenose, Watching The Apples Grow, The Jeannie C (mentions Little Dover, NS), Barrett's Privateers, Giant, and The Rawdon Hills; Farewell to Nova Scotia (traditional); Blue Nose (Stompin' Tom Connors); She's Called Nova Scotia (by Rita MacNeil); Cape Breton (by David Myles); Acadian Driftwood (by Robbie Robertson); Acadie (by Daniel Lanois); Song For The Mira (by Allister MacGillivray) and My Nova Scotia Home (by Hank Snow).

Nova Scotia has produced many significant songwriters, such as Grammy Award winning Gordie Sampson, who has written songs for Carrie Underwood ("Jesus, Take the Wheel", "Just a Dream", "Get Out of This Town"), Martina McBride ("If I Had Your Name", "You're Not Leavin Me"), LeAnn Rimes ("Long Night", "Save Myself"), and George Canyon ("My Name"). Many of Hank Snow's songs went on to be recorded by the likes of The Rolling Stones, Elvis Presley, and Johnny Cash. Cape Bretoners Allister MacGillivray and Leon Dubinsky have both written songs which, by being covered by so many popular artists, and by entering the repertoire of so many choirs around the world, have become iconic representations of Nova Scotian style, values and ethos. Dubinsky's pop ballad "We Rise Again" might be called the unofficial anthem of Cape Breton.

Music producer Brian Ahern is a Nova Scotian. He got his start by being music director for CBC television's Singalong Jubilee. He later produced 12 albums for Anne Murray ("Snowbird", "Danny's Song" and "You Won't See Me"); 11 albums for Emmylou Harris (whom he married at his home in Halifax on 9 January 1977). He also produced discs for Johnny Cash, George Jones, Roy Orbison, Glen Campbell, Don Williams, Jesse Winchester and Linda Ronstadt.

Grammy winning songwriter and music producer Cirkut, known for writing and producing songs for The Weeknd, Britney Spears, Miley Cyrus, and Katy Perry, was born and raised in Halifax before moving to Toronto in 2004.

Sports

Sport is an important part of Nova Scotia culture. There are numerous semi pro, university and amateur sports teams, for example, The Halifax Mooseheads, 2013 Canadian Hockey League Memorial Cup Champions, and the Cape Breton Screaming Eagles, both of the Quebec Major Junior Hockey League. The Halifax Hurricanes of the National Basketball League of Canada is another team that calls Nova Scotia home, and were 2016 league champions. Professional soccer came to the province in 2019 in the form of Canadian Premier League club HFX Wanderers FC.

The Nova Scotia Open was a professional golf tournament on the Web.com Tour in 2014 and 2015.

The province has also produced numerous athletes such as Sidney Crosby (ice hockey), Nathan Mackinnon (ice hockey), Lincoln Steen (Wrestling), Brad Marchand (ice hockey), Colleen Jones (curling), Al MacInnis (ice hockey), T. J. Grant (mixed martial arts), Rocky Johnson (wrestling, and father of Dwayne "The Rock" Johnson), George Dixon (boxing) and Kirk Johnson (boxing). The achievements of Nova Scotian athletes are presented at the Nova Scotia Sport Hall of Fame.

Education

The Minister of Education is responsible for the administration and delivery of education, as defined by the Education Act and other acts relating to colleges, universities and private schools. The powers of the Minister and the Department of Education are defined by the Ministerial regulations and constrained by the Governor-In-Council regulations.

All children until the age of 16 are legally required to attend school or the parent needs to perform home schooling. Nova Scotia's education system is split up into eight different regions including; Tri-County (22 schools), Annapolis Valley (42 schools), South Shore (25 schools), Chignecto-Central (67 schools), Halifax (135 schools), Strait (20 schools), and Cape Breton-Victoria Regional Centre for Education (39 schools).

Nova Scotia has more than 450 public schools for children. The public system offers primary to Grade 12. There are also private schools in the province. Public education is administered by seven regional school boards, responsible primarily for English instruction and French immersion, and also province-wide by the Conseil Scolaire Acadien Provincial, which administers French instruction to students whose primary language is French.

The Nova Scotia Community College system has 13 campuses around the province. With a focus on training and education, the college was established in 1988 by amalgamating the province's former vocational schools. In addition to the provincial community college system, there are more than 90 registered private colleges in Nova Scotia.

Ten universities are also situated in Nova Scotia, including Dalhousie University, University of King's College, Saint Mary's University, Mount Saint Vincent University, NSCAD University, Acadia University, Université Sainte-Anne, Saint Francis Xavier University, Cape Breton University and the Atlantic School of Theology.

See also

 Outline of Nova Scotia
 Index of Nova Scotia–related articles
 Acadiensis, scholarly history journal covering Atlantic Canada
 Bibliography of Nova Scotia

References

Bibliography

 
 Brebner, John Bartlet. New England's Outpost. Acadia before the Conquest of Canada (1927)
 Brebner, John Bartlet. The Neutral Yankees of Nova Scotia: A Marginal Colony During the Revolutionary Years (1937)
 
 
 Grenier, John. The Far Reaches of Empire. War in Nova Scotia, 1710–1760 . University of Oklahoma Press, Norman, 2008.
 Landry, Peter. The Lion & The Lily. Vol. 1, Trafford Publishing, Victoria, BC., 2007.
 Murdoch, Beamish.  History of Nova Scotia, Or Acadie. Vol 2. BiblioBazaar, LaVergne, TN, 1865.
 Pryke, Kenneth G. Nova Scotia and Confederation, 1864–74 (1979)
 Thomas Akins. History of Halifax, Brookhouse Press. 1895. (2002 edition)

External links

 
 

 
1867 establishments in Canada
Acadia
Atlantic Canada
British North America
Former British colonies and protectorates in the Americas
Former Scottish colonies
Provinces and territories of Canada
States and territories established in 1867
The Maritimes